Wiebe is a masculine given name of West Frisian origin, and may refer to:

 Wiebe Bijker (born 1951), Dutch professor
 Wiebe Draijer (born 1965), Dutch engineer
 Wiebe Nijenhuis (1951–2016), Dutch strongman
 Wiebe van der Vliet (born 1970), Dutch film editor

However, in one of two occasions, Wiebe  is used as a given name for females:

 Wiebe Berëza (born 1967), German artist

Dutch masculine given names